Fahad Al-Hamad (born July 1, 1998) is a Saudi Arabian professional footballer who currently plays for Al-Ahli as a defender.

Career
Al-Hamad started his career at the youth team of Al-Nassr. He left Al-Nassr in June 2019 and joined Spanish club UC Ceares. On 16 September 2019, Al-Hamad left Spain and joined Saudi Professional League side Al-Taawoun. On 27 August 2021, Al-Hamad signed a four-year contract with Al-Ahli.

Career statistics

Club

References

External links

1998 births
Living people
Association football defenders
People from Riyadh
Saudi Arabian footballers
Saudi Arabia youth international footballers
Al Nassr FC players
UC Ceares players
Al-Taawoun FC players
Al-Ahli Saudi FC players
Saudi Professional League players
Saudi First Division League players
Saudi Arabian expatriate footballers
Saudi Arabian expatriate sportspeople in Spain
Expatriate footballers in Spain